Steve Leslie may refer to:

 Steve Leslie (footballer, born 1952), English footballer (Colchester United)
 Steve Leslie (footballer, born 1976), Scottish footballer (Stoke City, Queen of the South)
 Steve Leslie (footballer, born 1987), Scottish footballer (Shrewsbury Town)